Thailand was the host nation for the 1970 Asian Games in Bangkok on 24 October to 4 September 1978. Thailand ended the games at 39 overall medals including 9 gold medals.

Nations at the 1970 Asian Games
1970
Asian Games